Cuauhtémoc, also known as Cuauhtemotzín, Guatimozín, or Guatémoc, was the Aztec ruler (tlatoani) of Tenochtitlan from 1520 to 1521, making him the last Aztec Emperor.  The name Cuauhtemōc means "one who has descended like an eagle", and is commonly rendered in English as "Descending Eagle", as in the moment when an eagle folds its wings and plummets down to strike its prey. This is a name that implies aggressiveness and determination.

Cuauhtémoc took power in 1520 as successor of Cuitláhuac and was a cousin of the late emperor Moctezuma II. His young wife, who was later known as Isabel Moctezuma, was one of Moctezuma's daughters. He ascended to the throne when he was around 25 years old, while Tenochtitlan was being besieged by the Spanish and devastated by an epidemic of smallpox brought to the Americas by Spanish conquerors. After the killings in the Great Temple, there were probably few Aztec captains available to take the position.

Early life
Cuauhtemoc's date of birth is unknown, as he does not enter the historical record until he became emperor. He was the eldest legitimate son of Emperor Ahuitzotl and may well have attended the last New Fire ceremony, marking the beginning of a new 52-year cycle in the Aztec calendar. According to several sources his mother, Tiyacapantzin, was a Tlatelolcan princess. Like the rest of Cuauhtemoc's early biography, that is inferred from knowledge of his age, and the likely events and life path of someone of his rank. Following education in the calmecac, the school for elite boys, and then his military service, he was named ruler of Tlatelolco, with the title cuauhtlatoani ("eagle ruler") in 1515. To have reached this position of rulership, Cuauhtemoc had to be a male of high birth and a warrior who had captured enemies for sacrifice. Cuauhtemoc married the Aztec princess who later became known as Isabel Moctezuma.

Rule
When Cuauhtemoc was elected tlatoani in 1520, Tenochtitlan had already been rocked by the invasion of the Spanish and their indigenous allies, the death of Moctezuma II, and the death of Moctezuma's brother Cuitlahuac, who succeeded him as ruler, but died of smallpox shortly afterwards. In keeping with traditional practice, the most able candidate among the high noblemen was chosen by vote of the highest noblemen, and Cuauhtemoc assumed the rulership.  Although under Cuitlahuac Tenochtitlan began mounting a defense against the invaders, it was increasingly isolated militarily and largely faced the crisis alone, as the numbers of Spanish allies increased with the desertion of many polities previously under its control.

Cuauhtémoc called for reinforcements from the countryside to aid the defense of Tenochtitlán, after eighty days of warfare against the Spanish. Of all the Nahuas, only Tlatelolcas remained loyal, and the surviving Tenochcas looked for refuge in Tlatelolco, where even women took part in the battle.  Cuauhtémoc was captured on August 13, 1521, while fleeing Tenochtitlán by crossing Lake Texcoco with his wife, family, and friends.

He surrendered to Hernán Cortés along with the surviving pipiltin (nobles) and, according to Spanish sources, he asked Cortés to take his knife and "strike me dead immediately". According to the same Spanish accounts, Cortés refused the offer and treated his foe magnanimously. "You have defended your capital like a brave warrior," he declared. "A Spaniard knows how to respect valor, even in an enemy."

At Cuauhtémoc's request, Cortés also allowed the defeated Mexica to depart the city unmolested. Subsequently, however, when the booty found did not measure up to the Spaniards' expectations, Cuauhtémoc was subjected to "torture by fire", whereby the soles of his bare feet were slowly broiled over red-hot coals, in an unsuccessful attempt to discover its whereabouts. On the statue to Cuauhtemoc, on the Paseo de la Reforma in Mexico City, there is a bas relief showing the Spaniards' torture of the emperor. Eventually, some gold was recovered but far less than Cortés and his men expected.

Cuauhtémoc, now baptized as Fernando Cuauhtémotzín, continued to hold his position under the Spanish, keeping the title of tlatoani, but he was no longer the sovereign ruler. From his surrender until his death, Cuauhtémoc was mostly kept in guarded custody by the Spaniards.

Execution

In 1525, Cortés took Cuauhtémoc and several other indigenous nobles on his expedition to Honduras, as he feared that Cuauhtémoc could have led an insurrection in his absence. While the expedition was stopped in the Chontal Maya capital of Itzamkanac, known as Acalan in Nahuatl, Cortés had Cuauhtémoc executed for allegedly conspiring to kill him and the other Spaniards.

There are a number of discrepancies in the various accounts of the event. According to Cortés himself, on 27 February 1525, he learned from a citizen of Tenochtitlan, Mexicalcingo, that Cuauhtémoc, Coanacoch (the ruler of Texcoco), and Tetlepanquetzal, the ruler of Tlacopan, were plotting his death. Cortés interrogated them until each confessed and then had Cuauhtémoc, Tetlepanquetzal, and another lord, Tlacatlec, hanged. Cortés wrote that the other lords would be too frightened to plot against him again, as they believed he had uncovered the plan through magic powers. Cortés's account is supported by the historian Francisco López de Gómara.

According to Bernal Díaz del Castillo, a conquistador serving under Cortés who recorded his experiences in his book The True History of the Conquest of New Spain, the supposed plot was revealed by two men, named Tapia and Juan Velásquez. Díaz portrays the executions as unjust and based on no evidence, and he admits to having liked Cuauhtémoc personally. He also records Cuauhtémoc giving the following speech to Cortés through his interpreter Malinche:

Díaz wrote that afterwards, Cortés suffered from insomnia because of guilt and badly injured himself while he was wandering at night.

Fernando de Alva Cortés Ixtlilxóchitl, a castizo historian and descendant of Coanacoch, wrote an account of the executions in the 17th century partly based on Texcocan oral tradition. According to Ixtlilxóchitl, the three lords were joking cheerfully with one another because of a rumor that Cortés had decided to return the expedition to Mexico, when Cortés asked a spy to tell him what they were talking about. The spy reported honestly, but Cortés invented the plot himself. Cuauhtémoc, Coanacoch, and Tetlepanquetzal were hanged as well as eight others. However, Cortés cut down Coanacoch, the last to be hanged, after his brother began rallying his warriors. Coanacoch did not have long to enjoy his reprieve, as Ixtlilxóchitl wrote that he died a few days later.

Tlacotzin, Cuauhtémoc's cihuacoatl, was appointed his successor as tlatoani. He died the next year before he could return to Tenochtitlan.

Bones

The modern-day town of Ixcateopan in the state of Guerrero is home to an ossuary purportedly containing Cuauhtémoc's remains. Archeologist Eulalia Guzmán, a "passionate indigenista", excavated the bones in 1949, which were discovered shortly after bones of Cortés, found in Mexico City, had been authenticated by the Instituto Nacional de Antropología e Historia (INAH). Initially, Mexican scholars congratulated Guzmán, but after a similar examination by scholars at INAH, their authenticity as Cuauhtemoc's was rejected, as the bones in the ossuary belonged to several different persons, several of them seemingly women. The finding caused a public uproar. A panel assembled by Guzmán gave support to the initial contention. The Secretariat of Public Education (SEP) had another panel examine the bones, which gave support to INAH's original finding, but did not report on the finding publicly. A scholarly study of the controversy was published in 2011 and argued that the available data suggests that the grave is an elaborate hoax prepared by a local of Ichcateopan as a way of generating publicity, and that subsequently supported by Mexican nationalists such as Guzman who wished to use the find for political purposes.

Legacy

Cuauhtemoc is the embodiment of indigenist nationalism in Mexico, being the only Aztec emperor who survived the conquest by the Spanish Empire (and their native allies). He is honored by a monument on the Paseo de la Reforma, his face has appeared on Mexican coins, banknotes, and he is celebrated in paintings, music, and popular culture.

Many places in Mexico are named in honour of Cuauhtémoc. These include Ciudad Cuauhtémoc in Chihuahua and the Cuauhtémoc borough of Mexico City. Smaller towns include Ciudad Cuauhtémoc, Veracruz and Ciudad Cuauhtémoc, Chiapas.

The Cuauhtémoc is a vessel of the Mexican Navy that serves as a cultural ambassador with frequent visits to world ports. There is a Cuauhtémoc station on Line 1 of the Mexico City metro as well as one for Moctezuma. There is also a metro station in Monterrey named after him.

Cuauhtémoc is also one of the few non-Spanish given names for Mexican boys that is perennially popular. For example, the politician
Cuauhtémoc Cárdenas and footballer Cuauhtémoc Blanco.

In the Aztec campaign of the PC game Age of Empires II: The Conquerors, the player plays as Cuauhtémoc, despite the name Montezuma for the campaign itself, and Cuauhtémoc narrates the openings and closings to each scenario. In the next installment to the series, Age of Empires 3: The War Chiefs, Cuauhtémoc was the leader of Aztecs.

In the 1996 Rage Against the Machine single People of the Sun, lyricist Zack De La Rocha rhymes "When the fifth sun sets get back reclaimed, The spirit of Cuauhtémoc alive and untamed".

Cuauhtémoc, in the name Guatemoc, is portrayed sympathetically in the adventure novel Montezuma's Daughter, by H. Rider Haggard. First appearing in Chapter XIV, he becomes friends with the protagonist after they save each other's lives. His coronation, torture, and death are described in the novel.

See also

List of Tenochtitlan rulers

References

Further reading
 Andrews, J. Richard, Introduction to Classical Nahuatl Norman: University of Oklahoma Press 2003.
 De Leon, Ann. " Archeology, Monuments and Writing the Mexican Nation" Antonio Peñafiel and the 'Aztec Palimpsest”, The Colorado Review of Hispanic Studies', Vol. 6, Fall 2008. Gillingham, Paul. Cuauhtémoc's Bones: Forging National Identity in Modern Mexico. Albuquerque: University of New Mexico Press.
 Johnson, Lyman L. "Digging Up Cuauhtémoc" in Death, Dismemberment, and Memory: Body Politics in Latin America, Lyman L. Johnson, ed. Albuquerque: University of New Mexico Press 2004, pp. 207–244.
León-Portilla, Miguel ed. The Broken Spears: Aztec Account of the Conquest of Mexico. Boston, 1992. Presents Nahuatl texts about Cuauhtémoc's deeds during the siege of Tenochtitlan.
 Restall, Matthew, Seven Myths of the Spanish Conquest. Oxford and New York: Oxford University Press 2004.
Scholes, France V., and Ralph Roys. The Maya Chontal Indians of Acalan-Tixchel''. Washington, D.C., 1948. Includes a unique text in Chontal that tells about the death of Cuauhtémoc.

External links

 
 

Tenochca tlatoque
16th-century monarchs in North America
16th-century indigenous people of the Americas
1490s births
1525 deaths
1520s in the Aztec civilization
Executed monarchs
Executed Mexican people
Mexican torture victims
People executed by New Spain
People executed by Spain by hanging
Spanish masculine given names
1520s in Mexico
1520s in New Spain
Dethroned monarchs
Monarchs taken prisoner in wartime